Terminal value can mean several things:

Terminal value (accounting), the salvage or residual value of an asset
Terminal value (finance), the future discounted value of all future cash flows beyond a given date
Terminal value (philosophy), core moral beliefs
Terminal value in Backus-Naur form, a grammar definition denoting a symbol that never appears on the left-hand side of the grammar list
In computer science generally, character(s) that signify the end of a line